Digweed is a surname. Notable people with the surname include:

George Digweed (born 1964), English sports shooter
Harry Digweed (1878–1965), English soccer player
John Digweed (born 1967),  English DJ, record producer and actor
Perry Digweed (born 1959), English soccer player